Sait as a given name or surname is the Turkish written form of the Arabic male given name Sa‘id.

The name Sait or the abbreviation SAIT may refer to:

People (given name or surname)
 Sait Faik Abasıyanık, Turkish writer
 Talât Sait Halman, Turkish poet
 Sait Idrizi, Slovenian footballer
 Küçük Mehmet Sait Pasha, Ottoman statesman
 Mustafa Sait Yazıcıoğlu, Turkish politician
 Paul Sait, Australian rugby league player
 Kevin Sait Australian Rules Footballer

Institutions and organisations (SAIT)

 Southern Alberta Institute of Technology
 South African Institute of Tax Practitioners
 South Australian Institute of Technology, forerunner of University of South Australia

Other
 Sait (clan), a community who originally hail from Kutch in Gujarat, India
 Advanced Intelligent Tape, also known as Super Advanced Intelligent Tape, high-capacity magnetic tape data storage format by Sony

See also
 Sa‘id

Turkish masculine given names